Georgiy Aleksandrovich Bobrinsky (1863 – 1928) was a Russian military and government figure, Adjutant general, governor general of the General Government of Galicia and Bukovina.

He was a son of Aleksandr Bobrinsky, a grandson of Catherine the Great.

External links
 Fyodor Trepov

1863 births
1928 deaths
Russian emigrants to France
Imperial Russian Army generals